Tobias Gedde-Dahl (3 June 1903 – 23 October 1994) was a Norwegian physician (pulmonologist ). He was Sectretary General of Nasjonalforeningen for folkehelsen from 1946 to 1972. He was decorated Knight of the Order of St. Olav in 1970. Gedde-Dahl was born in Sandsvær to parish priest Sofus Gedde-Dahl and Dagny Boye.  His son Truls Wilhelm was married to Målfrid Grude Flekkøy, and his daughter Lajla Margrete was married to Yngvar Ustvedt.

References

1903 births
1994 deaths
People from Kongsberg
Norwegian pulmonologists